Grzegorz Zengota  (born 29 August 1988 in Zielona Góra) is an international speedway rider from Poland.

Career
He was a member of Poland U-21 national team. He has won Under-21 Speedway World Cup twice (in 2008 and 2009).

In 2022, he helped Smederna win the Swedish Speedway Team Championship during the 2022 campaign.

Honours

World Championships 
 Individual U-21 World Championship
 2009 -  Goričan - 7th place (8 pts)
 Team U-21 World Championship
 2008 -  Holsted - U-21 World Champion (8 points)
 2009 -  Gorzów Wlkp. - U-21 World Champion (13 pts)

European Championships 
 Individual U-19 European Championship:
 2007  Częstochowa - 10th place (7 points)
 European Club Champions' Cup
 2009 - 4rd place in the Semi-Final

Domestic competitions 
 Individual U-21 Polish Championship:
 2008 - Rybnik - Bronze medal (12 points)
 2009 -  Leszno - 4th place (11 pts)
 Team U-21 Polish Championship:
 2005 - Rzeszów - Bronze medal (7 points)
 2008 -  Leszno - 4th place (11 points)
 Polish Silver Helmet (U-21)
 2007 - Rybnik - 2nd place (12 points +2)
 2008 -  Rzeszów - 2nd place (11+3 points)
 2009 -  Częstochowa - Winner (14 pts)
 Bronze Helmet U-19:
 2005 - Zielona Góra - 11th place (6 points)
 2007 - Gorzów Wlkp. - 5th place (9 points)

See also 
 Poland national speedway team

References

External links 
 Official website

1988 births
Living people
Polish speedway riders
Team Speedway Junior World Champions
People from Zielona Góra
Sportspeople from Lubusz Voivodeship